Lead(II) perchlorate is a chemical compound with the formula Pb(ClO4)2·xH2O, where is x is 0,1, or 3. It is an extremely hygroscopic white solid that is very soluble in water.

Preparation
Lead perchlorate trihydrate is produced by the reaction of lead(II) oxide, lead carbonate, or lead nitrate by perchloric acid:
Pb(NO3)2 + HClO4 → Pb(ClO4)2 + HNO3
The excess perchloric acid was removed by first heating the solution to 125 °C, then heating it under moist air at 160 °C to remove the perchloric acid by converting the acid to the dihydrate. The anhydrous salt, Pb(ClO4)2, is produced by heating the trihydrate to 120 °C under water-free conditions over phosphorus pentoxide. The trihydrate melts at 83 °C. The anhydrous salt decomposes into lead(II) chloride and lead(II) oxide at 250 °C. The monohydrate is produced by only partially dehydrating the trihydrate, and this salt undergoes hydrolysis at 103 °C.

The solution of anhydrous lead(II) perchlorate in methanol is explosive.

References

Lead compounds
Perchlorates